Dominic Pagon (born March 8, 1988) is a Jamaican professional tennis player.

Playing career 

Pagon has an International Tennis Federation win–loss record of 21–28 primarily through his Davis Cup exploits. He has represented Jamaica in the Davis Cup on seven occasions and was nominated as the country’s No. 1 player in 2008, 2009, 2013, 2014 and 2016. He has been selected to be the Captain for the Jamaican Davis Cup Team on four occasions (2013, 2016, 2018 & 2019) and has 18 wins overall. In June 2019, Pagon broke the record for most doubles wins in the history of Jamaica's Davis Cup tennis with 12 wins. He has played two ATP International Series singles event, both at the International Tennis Hall of Fame Champions Cup in 2007 & 2008. Pagon represented Jamaica at the 2006 Central American and Caribbean Games , 2007 Pan American Games and was a doubles quarter finalist at the 2014 Central American and Caribbean Games in Mexico. He was the top-ranked junior player in the Caribbean and Central American region as well as his home country. Pagon achieved a career-best ITF Junior Circuit ranking of No. 125. Pagon went to The College of William & Mary and earned All-Colonial Athletic Association honors three times as a Tribe player. He was named team captain in 2008 and won 55 singles and 47 doubles matches for W&M.

Davis Cup

Participations: (18–20)

   indicates the outcome of the Davis Cup match followed by the score, date, place of event, the zonal classification and its phase, and the court surface.

Personal life
Pagon was born in Kingston, Jamaica and started playing tennis at six years old. He was given the opportunity at age 14 to attend Saddlebrook Academies, a tennis and golf academy in Tampa Florida. At the age of 17, Pagon was offered a scholarship to attend the College of William and Mary and graduated in 2009 with a degree in Economics. He is the son of Nigel Pagon and Shirley Wilson.
Pagon has been married to his wife since 2021 and are expecting their first child together.

Coaching career
The 2016-17 season will be his second season as an assistant to head coach Jeff Kader at his alma mater The College of William and Mary.

In their first year, they guided W&M to a 15-9 record and its first Intercollegiate Tennis Association ranking in five years and climbed as high as No. 60 in the nation.

References

External links

1988 births
Living people
Jamaican male tennis players
Tennis players at the 2007 Pan American Games
Pan American Games competitors for Jamaica
William & Mary Tribe men's tennis players